Brazil men's national goalball team is the men's national team of Brazil. Goalball is a team sport designed specifically for athletes with a vision impairment.  The team takes part in international competitions.

Paralympic Games

2008 Beijing 

The team competed at the 2008 Summer Paralympics, from 6 to 17 September 2008, in the Beijing Institute of Technology Gymnasium 'bat wing' arena, Beijing, China.  There were twelve men's and eight women's teams. Athletes were Alexsander Celente, Thiago Costa, Legy Freire, Paulo Homem, Romario Marques, and Luiz Silva Filho.

Brazil placed 11th ahead of Spain.

2012 London 

The team competed in the 2012 Summer Paralympics from 30 August to 7 September 2012, in the Copper Box Arena, London, England.  There were twelve men's teams.

Round-robin

Quarter-finals

Semi-finals

Gold medal match

2016 Rio de Janeiro 

The team competed in the 2016 Summer Paralympics, with competition from Thursday 8 September to finals on Friday 16 September 2016, in the temporary Future Arena, Rio de Janeiro, Brazil.  There were ten men's and ten women's teams (a decrease of two men's teams from past years).

Round-robin

Quarter-finals

Semi-finals

Bronze medal match

2020 Tokyo 

The team competed in the 2020 Summer Paralympics, with competition from Wednesday 25 August to finals on Friday 3 September 2021, in the Makuhari Messe arena, Chiba, Tokyo, Japan.

Round-robin

 Quarter-finals

 Semi-finals

 Gold medal match

World Championships

2002 Rio de Janeiro  

The team competed in the 2002 World Championships, in Rio de Janeiro, Brazil, from 30 August 2002 to 8 September 2002.  There were fourteen men's and ten women's teams.

Brazil came ninth.

2010 Sheffield 

The team competed in the 2010 World Championships, from 20 to 25 June 2010, in Sheffield, England. There were sixteen men's and twelve women's teams.

Brazil came fourth behind Belgium.

2014 Espoo  

The team competed in the 2014 World Championships from 30 June to 5 July 2014, in Espoo, Finland.  There were fourteen men's and ten women's teams.  Athletes: Alexsander Celente (#3), Romario Marques (#6), José Roberto Oliveira (#1), Leandro Silva (#5), Leomon Silva (#4), and Alex Sousa (#2).  Leomon Silva was the highest male goalscorer of the championships, with 51 goals.

They placed first in Pool B, taking the quarter-finals 11:8 with Iran, mercing Lithuania 14:4 in the semi-finals, and finishing 9:1 against Finland to take gold.

2018 Malmö 

The team competed in the 2018 World Championships from 3 to 8 June 2018, at the Baltiska Hallen, Malmö, Sweden.  There were sixteen men's and twelve women's teams.  Athletes included: Andre Claudio Dantas, Jose Roberto Ferreira, Romario Diego Marques, Leomon Moreno da Silva (44 goals for the championships), Alex Melo de Souza, and Josemarcio da Silva Souza.

They placed first in Pool B, beat Sweden 9:3 in the quarter-finals, 7:6 against Lithuania in the semi-finals, beating Germany 8:3 to take the gold medal.

2022 Matosinhos 

The team competed in the 2022 World Championships from 7 to 16 December 2022, at the Centro de Desportos e Congressos de Matosinhos, Portugal.  There were sixteen men's and sixteen women's teams.  They placed first in Pool C, winning all seven games.

Brazil were crowned world champions for the third time in a row after beating China 5-4 in the gold medal game. Brazil together with China also secured a ticket for the 2024 Summer Paralympics which will take place at the Pierre de Coubertin Stadium in Paris, France.

IBSA World Games

2003 Quebec City  

The team competed in the 2003 IBSA World Games from Friday 1 to Sunday 10 August 2011, in Quebec City, Canada.  Playing in Pool C, they ranked second in the round-robin of seven teams.  Losing 7:4 to Canada, Brazil finished sixth.

2007 São Paulo 

The team competed in the 2007 IBSA World Games, from 28 July 2007 to 8 August 2007, in São Paulo, Brazil.  There were twenty-three men's and twelve women's teams.  Athletes included Alexsander Celente, Luis Filho, Freire Legy, and Romario Marques.

Playing in Group D round-robin, they beat Italy 2:1 in the quarter-finals, lost to Spain 2:5 in the semi-finals, and lost to Iran 7:8 in the bronze medal to finish fourth.

2011 Antalya  

The team competed in the 2011 IBSA World Games from 1 to 10 April 2011, in Antalya, Turkey, organised by the Turkish Blind Sports Federation.  There were fifteen men's and fourteen women's teams.  They placed fifth of seven teams in Group A, and came tenth to Slovenia 7:11 in the final standings.

Regional championships 

The team competes in the IBSA America goalball region. The winner of the championships usually qualify for a berth at the World Championships or the Paralympic Games.

2005 São Paulo 

The team competed at the 2005 IBSA Goalball Americas Regional Championships which were part of the Fourth IBSA Pan-American Games, the competition being from Monday 5 September 2005 to Friday 9 September 2005, in São Paulo, Brazil.  There were five men's teams: Argentina, Brazil, Canada, Mexico, and USA.

Brazil finished fourth ahead of Argentina.

2011 Guadalajara 

The team competed at the 2011 Parapan American Games from 13 to 19 November 2011, at the San Rafael Gymnasium in Guadalajara, Mexico.  There were six men's teams: Argentina, Brazil, Canada, El Salvador, Mexico, USA.  Athletes were Alexsander Celente, Leandro da Silva, Romário Marques, José Oliveira, Arestino Silva, and Filippe Silvestre.

Brazil took gold after the final match with USA.

2013 Colorado Springs 

The team competed at the 2013 Parapan American Games (which also hosted the 2013 IBSA World Youth Championships) from 11 to 14 July 2013, at Colorado Springs, Colorado, USA.  There were six men's teams: Argentina, Brazil, Canada, Puerto Rico, USA, Venezuela.

USA beat Brazil in the gold medal match.

2015 Toronto 

The team competed at the 2015 Parapan American Games from 8 August 2015 to 15 August 2015, at the Mississauga Sports Centre, Toronto, Ontario, Canada.  There were six men's teams: Argentina, Brazil, Canada, Puerto Rico, USA, Venezuela.  Athletes included Alexsander Almeida Maciel Celente, Josemarcio Da Silva Sousa, Alex De Melo Sousa, Jose Ferreira De Oliveira, Romario Marques, and Leomon Moreno Da Silva.

Brazil beat USA to take the gold medal.

2017 São Paulo 

The team competed at the 2017 IBSA Goalball Americas Championships from Wednesday 29 November 2017 to Sunday 3 December 2017, at São Paulo, Brazil.  There were eight men's teams: Argentina, Brazil, Canada, Costa Rica, Mexico, Peru, USA, and Venezuela (Costa Rica were disqualified for not having the minimum number of athletes to start a game).

Brazil beat USA to take the gold medal.

2019 Lima 

The team competed at the 2019 Parapan American Games from 23 August 2019 to 1 September 2019, at the Miguel Grau Coliseum, Lima, Peru.  This championships was a qualifier for the 2020 Paralympic Games.  There were eight men's teams: Argentina, Brazil, Canada, Guatemala, Mexico, Peru, USA, Venezuela.

Brazil beat USA to take the gold medal.

2022 São Paulo 

Due to the ongoing COVID-19 pandemic, the IBSA America championship moved from 6 to 13 November 2021, to 18 to 22 February 2022.  The event was held at the Centro de Treinamento Paralímpico (Paralympic Training Center) in São Paulo.  This championships was a qualifier for the 2022 World Championships.

There are thirteen men's teams: Argentina, Brazil, Canada, Chile, Colombia, Costa Rica, Guatemala, Mexico, Nicaragua, Peru, Puerto Rico, USA, Venezuela.

The team were very successful, mercing every competitor: Colombia (10:0), Chile (10:0), Argentina (14:4), Nicaragua (10:0), Venezuela (13:3), and Peru (10:0).  In the quarter-finals, they defeated Puerto Rico (10:0), and in the semi-finals, Colombia (13:3).  USA fell 2:12, allowing Brazil to take the gold medal.  The Brazil women's team also took gold.

See also 

 Disabled sports
 Brazil women's national goalball team
 Brazil at the Paralympics

References

Goalball men's
National men's goalball teams
Brazil at the Paralympics
Goalball in Brazil
Goalball in the Americas